Kalabo District is a district of Zambia, located in Western Province. The capital lies at Kalabo. As of the 2000 Zambian Census, the district had a population of 114,806 people. The district has 3 Secondary Schools namely Kalabo Secondary School, Nalionwa Day School and Lukona Secondary School, of which Kalabo Secondary School is the main school established in 1966. The district has attractive places that attract tourists, places like the Liuwa National Park, and Yuka Seventh-day Adventist Hospital. The main Hospital in the district is Kalabo District Hospital seconded by Yuka Seventh-day Adventist Hospital, Yuka is sometimes referred to as UK.

References

 
Districts of Western Province, Zambia